The following are the appointments to various Canadian Honours of 2013. Usually, they are announced as a part of the New Year and Canada Day celebrations and are published within the Canada Gazette. This follows the custom set out within the United Kingdom which publishes its appoints of various British Honours for New Year's and for the monarch's official birthday. However, instead of the midyear appointments announced on Victoria Day, the official birthday of the Canadian Monarch. This custom has been transferred with the celebration of Canadian Confederation and the creation of the Order of Canada.

However, as the Canada Gazette publishes appointment to various orders, decorations and medals, either Canadian or from Commonwealth and foreign states, this article will reference all Canadians so honoured during the 2013 calendar year.

Provincial Honours are not listed within the Canada Gazette, however they are listed within the various publications of each provincial government. Provincial honours are listed within the page.

The Order of Canada

Extraordinary Companion of the Order of Canada
 His Royal Highness The Prince Philip, Duke of Edinburgh, His Majesty's Privy Counsel for Canada, the Order of the Garter, the Order of the Thistle, the Order of Merit, the Order of the British Empire, the Order of New Zealand, the Queen's Service Order, the Order of Australia, the Order of Logohu, C.C., C.M.M., C.D., Aide de camp.

Companions of the Order of Canada

 Louise Charron, C.C.
 L. Jacques Ménard, C.C., O.Q. - this is a promotion within the Order

Honorary Officers of the Order of Canada

 Ronnie Hawkins, O.C.
 Bramwell Tovey, O.C.

Officers of the Order of Canada
 Arnold Boldt, O.C.
 Paul G. Cherry, O.C.
 The Honourable Sheila Copps, P.C., O.C.
 Julie M. Cruikshank, O.C.
 The Honourable Kenneth Wayne Dryden, P.C., O.C.
 Phil Fontaine, O.C., O.M.
 Paul-André Fortier, O.C.
 Michael Fullan, O.C.
 Colonel John Alan Gardam, O.C., O.M.M., M.S.M., C.D. (Retired)
 Scott Griffin, O.C.
 Jean Grondin, O.C.
 Michael Franklin Harcourt, O.C.
 Clyde Hertzman, O.C.
 Bonnie Sherr Klein, O.C.
 Veronica Lacey, O.C.
 Alain Lemaire, O.C.
 Laurent Lemaire, O.C.
 Michel Lemieux, O.C.
 Roderick Alexander Macdonald, O.C.
 M. G. Venkatesh Mannar, O.C.
 Roald Nasgaard, O.C.
 Victor Pilon, O.C., R.V.M.
 Donald Ross, O.C.
 John D. Ross, O.C.
 Danièle Sauvageau, O.C., M.S.C.
 David W. Scheifele, O.C.
 Ronald P. Schlegel, O.C.
 Rosemary Sullivan, O.C.
 Rachel Thibeault, O.C.
 The Honourable Brian Tobin, P.C., O.C.
 Ian Hugh Wallace, O.C.
 Lise Watier, O.C., O.Q. - this is a promotion within the Order
 Richard Waugh, O.C.
 Anthony Belcourt, O.C.
 Françoise Bertrand, O.C., C.Q.
 Dempsey Bob, O.C.
 William Breukelman, O.C.
 Robert Bringhurst, O.C.
 The Honourable Alexander B. Campbell, P.C., O.C.
 J. Edward Chamberlin, O.C.
 Denise Chong, O.C.
 Murray Costello, O.C.
 Frances Cutler, O.C.
 Jacqueline Desmarais, O.C., G.O.Q. - This is a promotion within the Order
 Nigel Fisher, O.C., O.Ont., M.S.C.
 Céline Galipeau, O.C., O.Q.
 Margie Gillis, O.C., C.Q. - This is a promotion within the Order
 John Ross Grace, O.C.
 Paul Gross, O.C.
 Michal Hornstein, O.C., G.O.Q. - This is a promotion within the Order
 Thomas J. Hudson, O.C.
 Patrick Lane, O.C.
 Carole Laure, O.C.
 Joseph Macerollo, O.C.
 John H. McArthur, O.C.
 Marnie McBean, O.C., M.S.M.
 Deepa Mehta, O.C., O.Ont.
 Arnold M. Noyek, O.C.
 David Edward Smith, O.C.
 John P. Smol, O.C.
 Robert Brent Thirsk, O.C., O.B.C.
 Roger F. Tomlinson, O.C. - This is a promotion within the Order
 Frederick James Wah, O.C.
 Dafydd Rhys Williams, O.C.
 Salim Yusuf, O.C.
 Luc Beauregard, O.C., C.Q.- This is a promotion within the Order

Members of the Order of Canada

 William John Aide, C.M.
 Garnet Angeconeb, C.M.
 René Angélil, C.M., O.Q.
 George William Archibald, C.M.
 Mitchell A. Baran, C.M.
 Andrew Barrie, C.M.
 Gaston Bellemare, C.M., O.Q.
 Warren T. Blume, C.M.
 Michael J. Brown, C.M.
 Stevie Cameron, C.M.
 John Cassaday, C.M.
 James K. M. Cheng, C.M.
 Bruce Clemmensen, C.M.
 Rebecca J. Cook, C.M.
 Jane Coop, C.M.
 Dennis Covill, C.M.
 Charmaine A. Crooks, C.M.
 Alban D'Amours, C.M., G.O.Q.
 Lorraine Desmarais, C.M.
 Beverley Diamond, C.M.
 Kildare Dobbs, C.M., O.Ont.
 James Durrell, C.M.
 Murray W. Enkin, C.M.
 Michael Enright, C.M.
 Janice Clare Filmon, C.M., O.M.
 Geoffrey D. Green, C.M.
 Albert Greer, C.M.
 Dana W. Hanson, C.M.
 Paul Henderson, C.M.
 Elmer Hildebrand, C.M., O.M.
 Martin Hunter, C.M.
 Aditya Jha, C.M.
 Harold Kalant, C.M.
 Harold Kalman, C.M.
 Elsie Kawulych, C.M., A.O.E.
 Janice MacKinnon, C.M., S.O.M.
 Leo MacNeil, C.M.
 David J. Magee, C.M.
 Fred V. Martin, C.M.
 Howard McCurdy, C.M., O.Ont.
 Claude Montmarquette, C.M.
 Hiroshi Nakamura, C.M.
 Jacqueline Oland, C.M.
 Marina Orsini, C.M.
 Jocelyn Palm, C.M.
 Stephen James Ralls, C.M.
 Heather Maxine Reisman, C.M.
 Angèle Rizzardo, C.M.
 Edward Sydney Schwartz, C.M.
 Joseph Shannon, C.M.
 Brigitte Shim, C.M.
 Linda Silver Dranoff, C.M.
 A. Howard Sutcliffe, C.M.
 James Bruce Ubukata, C.M.
 Jagannath Wani, C.M.
 Beverley Wybrow, C.M.
 Toyoshi Yoshihara, C.M.
 Elizabeth Baird, C.M.
 David Ross Beatty, C.M., O.B.E.
 Mary Boyd, C.M.
 Reuven P. Bulka, C.M.
 Paul J. J. Cavalluzzo, C.M., O.Ont.
 Édith Cloutier, C.M., C.Q.
 Shelagh Day, C.M.
 Nathalie Des Rosiers, C.M., O.Ont.
 Clare Drake, C.M., A.O.E.
 N. Murray Edwards, C.M.
 Louise Forand-Samson, C.M., O.Q.
 Gaétan Gervais, C.M.
 Paul Gobeil, C.M.
 Edward S. Goldenberg, C.M.
 Jacques Lacombe, C.M., C.Q.
 Sylvain Lafrance, C.M.
 Diane Lamarre, C.M.
 Bernard Lucht, C.M.
 Allister MacGillivray, C.M.
 Patricia Martens, C.M.
 Leslie McDonald, C.M.
 Heather Anne Menzies, C.M.
 Diane Morrison, C.M.
 Vice-Admiral Lawrence Murray, C.M., C.M.M., C.D. (Retired)
 Monica Patten, C.M.
 Léa Pool, C.M.
 Ross Porter, C.M.
 Alison Prentice, C.M.
 Barbara Reid, C.M., O.Ont.
 Michel Ringuet, C.M., C.Q.
 Kelly Russell, C.M.
 Anne M. Sado, C.M.
 Marjorie-Anne Sauder, C.M.
 Elexis Schloss, C.M.
 Gilbert Sicotte, C.M.
 Robert Silverman, C.M.
 Vaclav Smil, C.M.
 Jodi White, C.M.
 William J. Young, C.M.

Termination of appointments within the Order of Canada
 Garth Howard Drabinsky
 Camille Limoges
 Bernard Norman Barwin

Order of Military Merit

Extraordinary Commander of the Order of Military Merit
 Admiral, His Royal Highness The Prince Philip, Duke of Edinburgh, P.C., K.G., K.T., O.M., G.B.E., O.N.Z., Q.S.O., A.C., G.C.L., C.C., C.M.M., C.D., A.D.C., R.C.N.

Commanders of the Order of Military Merit

 Major-General Robert Pierre Félix Bertrand, C.M.M., C.D.
 Major-General Joseph Aimé Jean Yvan Blondin, C.M.M., C.D. (this is a promotion within the Order)
 Major-General Alan John Howard, C.M.M., M.S.M., C.D.
 Major-General Ian Charles Poulter, C.M.M., C.D. (this is a promotion within the Order)
 Major-General Joseph Marius Christian Rousseau, C.M.M., C.D.
 Rear-Admiral Andrew Mark Smith, C.M.M., C.D. (this is a promotion within the Order)
 Rear-Admiral Jennifer Jane Bennett, C.M.M., C.D. (this is a promotion within the Order)
 Rear-Admiral Maurice Frank Ronald Lloyd, C.M.M., C.D.
 Major-General Erik Nicolas Matern, C.M.M., C.D.
 Major-General Steven Patrick Noonan, C.M.M., M.S.C., C.D.
 Rear-Admiral Mark Arnold Gordon Norman, C.M.M., C.D.
 Lieutenant-General Alain Parent, C.M.M., C.D. (this is a promotion within the Order)

Officers of the Order of Military Merit

 Brigadier-General Paul Bury, O.M.M., C.D.
 Brigadier-General Anthony Thomas Stack, O.M.M., C.D.
 Colonel Donald Kirby Abbott, O.M.M., C.D.
 Colonel Jamieson Cade, O.M.M., M.S.M., C.D.
 Captain(N) Marie Elizabeth Cyd Courchesne, O.M.M., C.D.
 Captain(N) Joseph Pierre Gilles Couturier, O.M.M., C.D.
 Colonel Joseph Pierre Hervé Hercule Gosselin, O.M.M., C.D.
 Colonel Omer Henry Lavoie, O.M.M., M.S.C., C.D.
 Colonel Gregory David Loos, O.M.M., C.D.
 Colonel Guy Joseph Maillet, O.M.M., C.D.
 Colonel Pierre Ruel, O.M.M., C.D.
 Colonel Joseph Sylvain Sirois, O.M.M., C.D.
 Lieutenant-Colonel Sean Thomas Boyle, O.M.M., C.D.
 Lieutenant-Colonel Daniel Allan Farris, O.M.M., C.D.
 Commander Stephen Edwards Irwin, O.M.M., C.D.
 Lieutenant-Colonel Telah Sybil Morrison, O.M.M., C.D.
 Lieutenant-Colonel John Vincent Pumphrey, O.M.M., C.D.
 Lieutenant-Colonel Darlene Olga Quinn, O.M.M., C.D.
 Lieutenant-Colonel Gilles Maurice Sansterre, O.M.M., C.D.
 Lieutenant-Commander Luke Dolphis Charbonneau, O.M.M., C.D. (COATS)
 Major Marjorie Coakwell, O.M.M., C.D.
 Major Michael Thomas Fawcett, O.M.M., C.D.
 Major Raymond Joseph Stockermans, O.M.M., C.D.
 Commander John Jeffrey Charles Agnew, O.M.M., C.D.
 Lieutenant-Colonel Kenneth Freeman Butterworth, O.M.M., M.S.M., C.D.
 Brigadier-General Bernard Blaise Cathcart, O.M.M., C.D.
 Brigadier-General Michael Raymond Dabros, O.M.M., C.D.
 Commander Wayne Joseph Dipersio, O.M.M., C.D.
 Brigadier-General Joseph Richard Giguère, O.M.M., M.S.M., C.D.
 Major Luc Joseph Girouard, O.M.M., C.D.
 Colonel Patrick Kevin Gleeson, O.M.M., C.D.
 Major Patrick Shawn Cosgrave Heebner, O.M.M., C.D.
 Lieutenant-Colonel Michael Shane Holder, O.M.M., C.D.
 Captain(N) Raymond Liang-chiyu Kao, O.M.M., C.D.
 Major Robert William Dunbar MacKay, O.M.M., C.D.
 Colonel Alexander Donald Meinzinger, O.M.M., M.S.M., C.D.
 Colonel Samuel Michel Michaud, O.M.M., M.S.M., C.D.
 Captain(N) Joseph Alexandre Simon Page, O.M.M., C.D.
 Colonel Jacques Paul Robert Prévost, O.M.M., M.S.M., C.D.
 Lieutenant-Colonel Harjit Sajjan, O.M.M., C.D.
 Lieutenant-Commander Lorinda Mae Semeniuk, O.M.M., C.D.
 Colonel Kristiana Margit Stevens, O.M.M., C.D.
 Lieutenant-Colonel Joseph Armand Christian St-Pierre, O.M.M., C.D.
 Colonel Lowell Earl Thomas, O.M.M., C.D.
 Captain Kenneth Charles Toomey, O.M.M., C.D.
 Colonel Richard Turner Witherden, O.M.M., M.B., C.D.

Members of the Order of Military Merit

 Major Joseph Eugène Vincent Michael Marc Moo Sang, M.M.M., C.D.
 Captain Lorne Joseph André Doucet, M.M.M., C.D.
 Lieutenant(N) Linda Anne Forward, M.M.M., C.D.
 Captain Nathalie Marie Mercer, M.M.M., C.D.
 Captain Tony Pépin, M.M.M., C.D.
 Captain Réjean Richard, M.M.M., C.D.
 Captain Leo Richard Snook, M.M.M., C.D.
 Captain Jonathan Burnside Utton, M.M.M., C.D.
 Captain Edwin Grant Whittla, M.M.M., C.D.
 Lieutenant Wayne Denis Forster, M.M.M., C.D.
 Lieutenant Horace Francis Lane, M.M.M., C.D. (Canadian Ranger)
 Chief Warrant Officer Wayne Alan Bartlett, M.M.M., M.S.C., C.D.
 Chief Warrant Officer Haley Joseph Bransfield, M.M.M., C.D.
 Chief Warrant Officer Bernard Joseph Jacques Caron, M.M.M., C.D.
 Chief Warrant Officer Joseph Marcel Chiasson, M.M.M., C.D.
 Chief Warrant Officer Joseph Claude Chouinard, M.M.M., C.D.
 Chief Petty Officer 1st Class Leonard James Denning, M.M.M., C.D.
 Chief Warrant Officer Karl Richard Joseph Ellis, M.M.M., C.D.
 Chief Petty Officer 1st Class David Warren Hart, M.M.M., C.D.
 Chief Warrant Officer Joseph Ovila Pierrot Jetté, M.M.M., C.D.
 Chief Warrant Officer Robert Denis Joseph Lamothe, M.M.M., C.D.
 Chief Warrant Officer Joseph Lionel Pierre Leger, M.M.M., C.D.
 Chief Warrant Officer Dianne Maidment, M.M.M., C.D.
 Chief Warrant Officer Deborah Ann Matthews, M.M.M., C.D.
 Chief Warrant Officer Robert Claude McCann, M.M.M., C.D.
 Chief Warrant Officer Norman James McLanaghan, M.M.M., C.D.
 Chief Warrant Officer Bradley William John Montgomery, M.M.M., M.S.M., C.D.
 Chief Warrant Officer Joseph Jean-Pierre Morin, M.M.M., C.D.
 Chief Warrant Officer Daniel Thomas Moyer, M.M.M., C.D.
 Chief Warrant Officer Derek John Munroe, M.M.M., C.D.
 Chief Petty Officer 1st Class Barry Keith Petten, M.M.M., C.D.
 Chief Warrant Officer Ernest Gérard Joseph Poitras, M.M.M., C.D.
 Chief Warrant Officer William Alan Richards, M.M.M., M.S.M., C.D.
 Chief Warrant Officer Joseph Patrice Claude Rioux, M.M.M., C.D.
 Chief Warrant Officer Shawn Douglas Stevens, M.M.M., M.S.M., C.D.
 Chief Warrant Officer Joseph Raymond Guy St-Jean, M.M.M., C.D.
 Chief Warrant Officer Robert Michael Unger, M.M.M., C.D.
 Chief Warrant Officer Chadley James Allen Wagar, M.M.M., C.D.
 Chief Warrant Officer Christopher John Waugh, M.M.M., C.D.
 Chief Warrant Officer Kevin Charles West, M.M.M., C.D.
 Chief Petty Officer 1st Class Stephen Douglas Wood, M.M.M., C.D.
 Master Warrant Officer Jorg Karl-Albert Adler, M.M.M., C.D.
 Master Warrant Officer Trent Donald Doucette, M.M.M., C.D.
 Chief Petty Officer 2nd Class Harry Sui Ming Fong, M.M.M., C.D.
 Chief Petty Officer 2nd Class Michael Murray Garuk, M.M.M., C.D.
 Chief Petty Officer 2nd Class Janet Alexandra Graham-Smith, M.M.M., C.D.
 Master Warrant Officer Shane Gerald Holwell, M.M.M., C.D.
 Chief Petty Officer 2nd Class Christopher Peter Koblun, M.M.M., C.D.
 Master Warrant Officer Serge Laforge, M.M.M., C.D.
 Master Warrant Officer Joseph Roland Claude Lavoie, M.M.M., C.D.
 Master Warrant Officer Joseph Sylvain Alain Marcil, M.M.M., C.D.
 Master Warrant Officer Steven Vincent Merry, M.M.M., C.D.
 Master Warrant Officer Stephen George McNabb, M.M.M., C.D.
 Master Warrant Officer Keith Michael Olstad, M.M.M., C.D.
 Master Warrant Officer Paul Joseph Pinel, M.M.M., C.D.
 Chief Petty Officer 2nd Class Joseph Ovila Mario Richard, M.M.M., C.D.
 Master Warrant Officer Joseph Eugène Patrick Richer, M.M.M., C.D.
 Master Warrant Officer Joseph Marcel Claude Rodrigue, M.M.M., C.D.
 Master Warrant Officer Joseph Normand Éric Saint-Pierre, M.M.M., C.D.
 Master Warrant Officer Sandra Marie Cecile Spragg, M.M.M., C.D.
 Master Warrant Officer Marie Antonia Suzie Thibault, M.M.M., C.D.
 Master Warrant Officer Joseph Laurent Stéphane Vallée, M.M.M., C.D.
 Master Warrant Officer James Francis Warwick, M.M.M., C.D.
 Warrant Officer Barbara Joyce Bajema, M.M.M., C.D.
 Warrant Officer Patrick Roland Bowers, M.M.M., C.D.
 Warrant Officer Robert Joseph Clarke, M.M.M., C.D.
 Petty Officer 1st Class Ronald Keith Crawford, M.M.M., C.D.
 Warrant Officer Peter William Dingle, M.M.M., C.D.
 Warrant Officer Wayne Edward Lundrigan, M.M.M., C.D.
 Warrant Officer Deryk James McGougan, M.M.M., C.D.
 Warrant Officer Patricia Mears, M.M.M., C.D.
 Petty Officer 1st Class Derrick Paul Nearing, M.M.M., C.D.
 Warrant Officer Gordon Nichol, M.M.M., C.D.
 Petty Officer 1st Class Linda May Parrish, M.M.M., C.D.
 Petty Officer 1st Class David William Poole, M.M.M., M.S.M., C.D.
 Petty Officer 1st Class Dion Sandy Vagn Randell, M.M.M., C.D.
 Warrant Officer Joseph Jean Dominic Roux, M.M.M., C.D.
 Warrant Officer Cameron Webster Stevens, M.M.M., C.D.
 Warrant Officer Alfred Bervyl Williston, M.M.M., C.D.
 Warrant Officer Alan Wilson, M.M.M., C.D.
 Warrant Officer Joseph Émilien François Yargeau, M.M.M., C.D.
 Warrant Officer Troy Anthony Zuorro, M.M.M., C.D.
 Sergeant Jeanette Esther Botari, M.M.M., C.D.
 Petty Officer 2nd Class Yves François Clément, M.M.M., M.S.M., C.D.
 Sergeant Peter Moon, M.M.M., C.D. (Canadian Ranger)
 Sergeant Harold Smallbones, M.M.M., C.D.
 Sergeant Karen Bernice Squires, M.M.M., C.D.
 Corporal Glenn Joseph Gerald Gray, M.M.M., C.D.
 Warrant Officer Paul James Albertson, M.M.M., C.D.
 Chief Warrant Officer Peter Stephen Andrews, M.M.M., C.D.
 Major Kevin Andrew Barry, M.M.M., C.D.
 Petty Officer 1st Class Jean Georges Christian Bélanger, M.M.M., C.D.
 Master Corporal Pierre Bernier (Canadian Ranger), M.M.M.
 Chief Warrant Officer Joseph Michel Bezeau, M.M.M., C.D.
 Master Warrant Officer James Blackmore, M.M.M., C.D.
 Chief Petty Officer 1st Class Wallace Francis Brake, M.M.M., C.D.
 Chief Warrant Officer Joseph André Michael Brideau, M.M.M., C.D.
 Captain Joseph Jean-Claude Caron, M.M.M., C.D.
 Warrant Officer Patrice Pascal Chartrand, M.M.M., M.S.M., C.D.
 Chief Warrant Officer Joseph Bruno Martin Colbert, M.M.M., C.D.
 Master Warrant Officer Gerald Ross Colgan, M.M.M., C.D.
 Lieutenant(N) Robert John Cookson, M.M.M., C.D.
 Warrant Officer Susan Yvonne Coupal, M.M.M., C.D.
 Chief Warrant Officer William John Crabb, M.M.M., M.S.M., C.D.
 Chief Warrant Officer Gordon Crossley, M.M.M., C.D.
 Chief Warrant Officer Shawn Edwin Croucher, M.M.M., C.D.
 Captain Kirk Darch, M.M.M., C.D.
 Master Warrant Officer Mary Denise D'Astous, M.M.M., C.D.
 Chief Warrant Officer Joseph Maurice Stephan Despins, M.M.M., C.D.
 Chief Petty Officer 2nd Class James Thomas Dicks, M.M.M., C.D.
 Warrant Officer Jeffrey Frank Allan Dickson, M.M.M., C.D.
 Warrant Officer Joseph Daniel Stéphane Dionne, M.M.M., C.D.
 Master Warrant Officer Keith Wayne Dobbin, M.M.M., C.D.
 Chief Warrant Officer Wayne Thomas Duggan, M.M.M., C.D.
 Warrant Officer Joseph Claude François Dutil, M.M.M., C.D.
 Chief Petty Officer 2nd Class Barry James Eady, M.M.M., C.D.
 Chief Petty Officer 1st Class Duncan Christian John Elbourne, M.M.M., C.D.
 Chief Warrant Officer Darcy Shawn Elder, M.M.M., M.S.M., C.D.
 Master Warrant Officer Paul Elliott, M.M.M., C.D.
 Master Warrant Officer Stephen Darrell Ellis, M.M.M., C.D.
 Sergeant Michael Wade Escott, M.M.M., C.D.
 Warrant Officer Donald Bruce Farr, M.M.M., C.D.
 Master Warrant Officer Darryl Shane Foster, M.M.M., C.D.
 Master Warrant Officer Brian William Mark Gauthier, M.M.M., C.D.
 Master Warrant Officer William Brent Gittens, M.M.M., C.D.
 Warrant Officer Eric Richard Green, M.M.M., M.S.M., C.D.
 Master Warrant Officer John Arthur Hann, M.M.M., C.D.
 Sergeant Christopher Gerard Hanrahan, M.M.M., C.D.
 Captain Andrew Harrington, M.M.M., C.D.
 Master Warrant Officer Timothy Edmund Holland, M.M.M., C.D.
 Warrant Officer Curtis Russell Hollister, M.M.M., C.D.
 Chief Petty Officer 2nd Class Cameron Wilson Jones, M.M.M., C.D.
 Chief Petty Officer 2nd Class Todd Kelly, M.M.M., C.D.
 Captain Jennifer Rose Kennedy, M.M.M., C.D.
 Chief Warrant Officer René Kiens, M.M.M., M.S.M., C.D.
 Chief Petty Officer 1st Class Joseph Pierre Bertrand Lafontaine, M.M.M., C.D.
 Warrant Officer Eric John LeClair, M.M.M., C.D.
 Chief Warrant Officer Joseph Pierre Roger Lefebvre, M.M.M., C.D.
 Captain Marie Irène Micheline Leguerrier, M.M.M., C.D.
 Petty Officer 1st Class Christopher John Lewis, M.M.M., C.D.
 Chief Warrant Officer Joseph Stephen Madore, M.M.M., C.D.
 Chief Warrant Officer Joseph Mario Denis Mailloux, M.M.M., C.D.
 Sergeant Joël Denis Joseph Manaigre, M.M.M., C.D.
 Master Warrant Officer Nicolas John Manoukarakis, M.M.M., C.D.
 Chief Warrant Officer Joseph Claude Mario Martel, M.M.M., C.D.
 Chief Petty Officer 1st Class Marcel Arthur Maynard, M.M.M., M.S.M., C.D.
 Chief Petty Officer 2nd Class Leo McDonald, M.M.M., C.D.
 Chief Petty Officer 1st Class Geoffrey Ewart Mctigue, M.M.M., C.D.
 Chief Warrant Officer Joseph Julien André Moreau, M.M.M., M.S.M., C.D.
 Master Warrant Officer Francis Justin Morneau, M.M.M., C.D.
 Captain Garry Morphet, M.M.M., C.D.
 Chief Warrant Officer Sherman Norman Neil, M.M.M., C.D.
 Captain Jose Ramon Nunez, M.M.M., C.D.
 Warrant Officer Donald Bradley Olmstead, M.M.M., C.D.
 Chief Warrant Officer Marie Dorothée Paradis, M.M.M., C.D.
 Master Warrant Officer Jean-Claude Jean Parent, M.M.M., C.D.
 Petty Officer 2nd Class Alana Michelle Power, M.M.M., C.D.
 Chief Warrant Officer Allan Rishchynski, M.M.M., C.D.
 Captain Mark Douglas Rittwage, M.M.M., C.D.
 Chief Warrant Officer Joseph Normand Michel Rivard, M.M.M., C.D.
 Chief Warrant Officer Marie Alphonsine Marina Roberge, M.M.M., C.D.
 Chief Warrant Officer Joseph Claude Jacques Roy, M.M.M., C.D.
 Warrant Officer Marlene AnnMarie Shillingford, M.M.M., C.D.
 Master Warrant Officer Richard Stacey, M.M.M., S.M.V., C.D.
 Master Warrant Officer Michael Dennis Stein, M.M.M., C.D.
 Warrant Officer Joseph Joël Laurent Darcy St-Laurent, M.M.M., S.C., M.B., C.D.
 Master Warrant Officer Leigh Matthew Taylor, M.M.M., C.D.
 Warrant Officer Jody Dwayne Tower, M.M.M., C.D.
 Chief Warrant Officer Joseph Fernand Luc Tremblay, M.M.M., C.D.
 Chief Warrant Officer Joseph Raymond Mario Tremblay, M.M.M., C.D.
 Petty Officer 1st Class Joseph Rolland Jacques Yvan Pierre Tremblay, M.M.M., C.D.
 Major Elizabeth Ann van Oostrum, M.M.M., C.D.
 Master Warrant Officer Joseph François Vidal, M.M.M., C.D.

Order of Merit of the Police Forces

Commander of the Order of Merit of the Police Forces

 Commissioner Christopher D. Lewis, C.O.M. - This is a promotion within the Order
 Chief Clive L. Weighill, C.O.M. - This is a promotion within the Order

Officers of the Order of Merit of the Police Forces

 Chief Keith J. Atkinson, O.O.M. - this is a promotion within the Order
 Deputy Commissioner Craig J. Callens, O.O.M.
 Chief Paul Douglas Cook, O.O.M. - this is a promotion within the Order
 Assistant Director Didier Deramond, O.O.M.
 Chief Bradley S. Duncan, O.O.M. - this is a promotion within the Order
 Chief Jennifer Evans, O.O.M.
 Inspector Michel Forget, O.O.M.
 Director General Anna Gray-Henschel, O.O.M.
 Chief Richard Hanson, O.O.M. - this is a promotion within the Order
 Director Mario Harel, O.O.M.
 Deputy Commissioner Peter Henschel, O.O.M.
 Chief Rod R. Knecht, O.O.M. - this is a promotion within the Order
 Assistant Commissioner Roman N. Lipinski, O.O.M.
 Sergeant Charles Andre Momy, O.O.M.
 Deputy Chief William Francis Moore, O.O.M.
 Director Shelagh Elizabeth Morris, O.O.M.
 Director Marc Parent, O.O.M. - this is a promotion within the Order
 Chief Daniel Colin Parkinson, O.O.M. - this is a promotion within the Order
 Chief Constable Robert A. Rich, O.O.M. - this is a promotion within the Order
 Deputy Director General Marcel Savard, O.O.M.
 Superintendent Donald J. J. Spicer, O.O.M. - this is a promotion within the Order
 Deputy Commissioner William Scott Tod, O.O.M.
 Staff Superintendent Jane Wilcox, O.O.M. - this is a promotion within the Order

Members of the Order of Merit of the Police Forces

 Superintendent Brian Adams, M.O.M.
 Chief Superintendent Janice Rose Armstrong, M.O.M.
 Constable Michael Arruda, M.O.M.
 Director Sharon Baiden, M.O.M.
 Chief Superintendent Ricky W. Barnum, M.O.M.
 Assistant Commissioner Randall J. Beck, M.O.M.
 Chief Superintendent Donald William Bell, M.O.M.
 Sergeant Colin Evan Lamont Brown, M.O.M.
 Chief Superintendent Brian Cantera, M.O.M.
 Deputy Chief Thomas W. B. Carrique, M.O.M.
 Superintendent James William Carroll, M.O.M.
 Sergeant Michael Chicorelli, M.O.M.
 Inspector Brian F. Cookman, M.O.M.
 Sergeant George A. Couchie, M.O.M.
 Superintendent Susanne Decock, M.O.M.
 Assistant Commissioner François Deschênes, M.O.M.
 Chief John C. Domm, M.O.M.
 Sergeant Charles Dubois, M.O.M.
 Staff Sergeant Cameron E. Durham, M.O.M.
 Superintendent Selwyn John Fernandes, M.O.M.
 Inspector Gerard E. Francois, M.O.M.
 Staff Sergeant Pierre Gauthier, M.O.M.
 Superintendent Ronald Girling, M.O.M.
 Chief Superintendent James R. D. Gresham, M.O.M.
 Constable Evens Guercy, M.O.M.
 Chief John Peter Hagarty, M.O.M.
 Chief Constable Paul Hames, M.O.M.
 Sergeant Michael Hunter, M.O.M.
 Detective Sergeant Leonard Gordon Isnor, M.O.M.
 Chief Constable Dave Jones, M.O.M.
 Mr. François Landry, M.O.M.
 Deputy Commissioner James Douglas Lang, M.O.M.
 Inspector William James Law, M.O.M.
 Inspector Michael W. Leighton, M.O.M.
 Sergeant Marc Lépine, M.O.M.
 Chief Constable Peter A. Lepine, M.O.M.
 Superintendent Brenda M. Lucki, M.O.M.
 Superintendent Kenneth MacDonald, M.O.M.
 Chief Superintendent Craig Steven MacMillan, M.O.M.
 Inspector Dan Markiewich, M.O.M.
 Inspector Steven James Martin, M.O.M.
 Deputy Chief Robert D. Morin, M.O.M.
 Inspector Glen L. Motz, M.O.M.
 Chief Superintendent Joseph Adrian Oliver, M.O.M.
 Deputy Chief Robert Percy, M.O.M.
 Inspector Adua Porteous, M.O.M.
 Superintendent Paul Richards, M.O.M.
 Inspector Lise Roussel, M.O.M.
 Chief Alfred Rudd, M.O.M.
 Corporal Wayne L. Russett, M.O.M.
 Assistant Commissioner Marianne C. Ryan, M.O.M.
 Inspector Allan Godfrey Sauve, M.O.M.
 Superintendent Michael P. Shea, M.O.M.
 Provincial Commander Mary Silverthorn, M.O.M.
 Superintendent Eric Kenneth Slinn, M.O.M.
 Staff Sergeant Brian Snyder, M.O.M.
 Chief William B. Sornberger, M.O.M.
 Inspector Bob Stewart, M.O.M.
 Deputy Chief Stephen Streeter, M.O.M.
 Chaplain James E. Turner, M.O.M.
 Sergeant Detective Benoit Vigeant, M.O.M.
 Superintendent Christopher Mark Wyatt, M.O.M.
 Dr. Akira Brian Yamashita, M.O.M.

Royal Victorian Order

Member of the Royal Victorian Order
 Greg Peters

Most Venerable Order of the Hospital of St. John of Jerusalem

Knights and Dames of the Order of St. John
 His Honour, the Honourable H. Frank Lewis, O.P.E.I., Charlottetown, PEI
 Commander Sylvain Bissonnette, Laval, QC
 Robert Cade, C.D., Regina, SK
 Gilbert James Carter, Sussex, NB
 Her Honour, the Honourable Judith Isabel Guichon, O.B.C., Victoria, BC

Commanders of the Order of St. John
 Daniel Faucher, Repentigny, QC
 Marianne Rita Hagen, Timberlea, NS
 Commander (Retired) Robert Henry McIlwaine, C.D., Vancouver, BC
 Thomas Craig Wilson, Surrey, BC
 Commodore Hans Jung, O.M.M., C.D., Ottawa, ON
 Carmie McCormack, Georgetown, ON
 Keith Ernest Perron, Guelph, ON

Officers of the Order of St. John
 Constable Kirk Patrick Hughes, Deline, NT
 Kevin Robert Edward McCormick, Sudbury, ON
 Captain(N) (Retired) Normand Potvin, Courtenay, BC
 Mohammad Imran Shamsi, Port Coquitlam, BC
 André Fournier, Drummondville, QC
 Steven David Gaetz, Winnipeg, MB
 Major Carl Gauthier, M.M.M., C.D., Nepean, ON
 Dany Houde, Québec, QC
 Lieutenant(N) Jeffrey Lee, Richmond, BC
 Kellie Lee Mitchell, Yellowknife, NT
 John Nadeau, Whistler, BC
 Kathleen May Parker, Walkerton, ON
 James Patterson, Ottawa, ON
 Annie Pinard, Saint-Ambroise-de-Kildare, QC
 Lieutenant Eric Lorenzo Marcel Roy, C.D., Ottawa, ON
 Lieutenant-Colonel (Retired) Douglas Edward Slowski, C.D., Nanaimo, BC
 Julia Kristine Zoetewey, Vancouver, BC

Members of the Order of St. John
 Daniel Alexander Arbuckle, Ingersoll, ON
 Tina Basque, Port Perry, ON
 Robert Boily, Laval, QC
 Nancy Darlene Burrows, River Ryan, NS
 Josée Cadieux, Princeville, QC
 Dyane Cadoret, Québec, QC
 Samson Ka Yang Chan, Vancouver, BC
 Vincenzo Cicero, Acton, ON
 Bradley John Collyer, Peterborough, ON
 Wendy Lilian Downing, North York, ON
 Marilyn Marie Dwyer, Brantford, ON
 Donna Marie Flemming, Ketch Harbour, NS
 Captain David Jean-Baptiste Donat Moreau Fortin, Saint-Jacques-le-Mineur, QC
 Jimmie Leroy Francis, Burlington, ON
 Matthew Aaron Glover, Burlington, ON
 Colonel Hercule Gosselin, O.M.M., C.D., Montréal, QC
 Allan Graham, Oshawa, ON
 Christina Hong, Burnaby, BC
 Master Warrant Officer Henry Klausnitzer, C.D., London, ON
 Patty Wai Yin Lo, Thornhill, ON
 Mary Georgette Loblaw, Port Moody, BC
 Wendy Luong, Vancouver, BC
 Lloyd David McKnight, M.M.M., Chester Basin, NS
 Evan John Charles Mohns, Arnprior, ON
 Adrian Kar-Hao Ng, Vancouver, BC
 Sergeant Lawrence William O'Brien, C.D., Courtenay, BC
 Jonathan William Peppler, Elmwood, ON
 Master Warrant Officer Richard Louis Perreault, C.D., Smiths Falls, ON
 Shirley Ann Philpot, Kamloops, BC
 Marsha Elaine Seens, Ajax, ON
 Richard Vincent Teixeira, Markham, ON
 Lieutenant-Colonel Paul Bradford, LaSalle, ON
 Keith Gordon Brine, Winnipeg, MB
 Norma Alice Broadbear, Belleville, ON
 Master Corporal (Retired) Paul Joseph Currie, C.D., Fort Smith, NT
 Lori Elaine Dubinsky, Dugald, MB
 Her Honour Linda May Ethell, Edmonton, AB
 Leon Frederick Flannigan, Rivers, MB
 Robert Goneau, Rockland, ON
 Glen Currie Greenhill, Courtenay, BC
 Yves Harvey, Québec, QC
 Nancy Lynette Hollman, Belleville, ON
 Benjamin Kay Yip Kaan, Vancouver, BC
 Darrel Elbert Kennedy, Ottawa, ON
 Janie Margaret Law, Dugald, MB
 Heather Marie Gordon Leong, Cambridge, ON
 Jeffrey Lott, Nanaimo, BC
 Reverend Joseph Francis Malley, Miramichi, NB
 Lyndsay Alison McGregor, Hanover, ON
 Russell Dennis Newcombe, Pitt Meadows, BC
 David Robert Paradis, Barrie, ON
 David Christopher Rakobowchuk, Ottawa, ON
 Trent Alexander Ralston, Burlington, ON
 Lieutenant-Colonel (Retired) Henry Leslie Lawrence Simpson, C.D., Belleville, ON

Provincial Honours

National Order of Québec

Grand Officers of the National Order of Québec

 Michal Hornstein, G.O.Q.
 Bernard Lamarre, G.O.Q

Officers of the National Order of Québec  

 Frederick Andermann, O.Q
 Marc-André Bédard, O.Q
 Claude Corbo, O.Q
 Hélène Desmarais, O.Q
 Michel Dumont, O.Q
 Monique F. Leroux, O.Q
 Monique Jérôme-Forget, O.Q
 Yves Martin, O.Q
 André Melançon, O.Q
 Eric Herbert Molson, O.Q
 Claude C. Roy, O.Q
 H. Arnold Steinberg, O.Q

Honorary Officer of the National Order of Québec
 Nana Mouskouri, O.Q

Knight of the National Order of Québec

 Luc Beauregard, C.Q
 Aldo Bensadoun, C.Q
 Claire Bolduc, C.Q
 Walter Boudreau, C.Q
 Nicole Brossard, C.Q
 Léa Cousineau, C.Q
 Lise Denis, C.Q
 Danielle Descent, C.Q
 Rose Dufour, C.Q
 Minnie Grey, C.Q
 Louise Lemieux Bérubé, C.Q
 Marie-Nicole Lemieux, C.Q
 René Malo, C.Q
 Hany Moustapha, C.Q
 Maurice Ptito, C.Q
 Michel Ringuet, C.Q
 René Rozon, C.Q
 Lamine Touré, C.Q
 Jean-Marie Tremblay, C.Q

Saskatchewan Order of Merit

 Dr. Richard B. Baltzan, O.C., S.O.M., F.R.C.P. (C)
 John V. Cross, C.M., S.O.M.
 May Henderson, S.O.M.
 Grant J. Kook, S.O.M., C.Dir.
 Dr. J.R. (Jim) Miller, O.C., S.O.M., F.R.S.C.
 Dr. George R. Reed, C.M., S,O.M., LL.D.
 Arthur Tsuneo Wakabayashi, C.M., S.O.M.

Secret awards of Canadian Decorations
 22 June 2013: His Excellency the Right Honourable David Johnston, Governor General and Commander-in-Chief of Canada, on the recommendation of the Chief of Defence Staff, has awarded two Stars of Military Valour, one Medal of Military Valour, one Meritorious Service Cross (Military Division), and one Meritorious Service Medal (Military Division) to members of the Canadian Special Operations Forces Command, and two Meritorious Service Medals (Military Division) to members of the Chief of Defence Intelligence for military activities of high standard that have brought great honour to the Canadian Armed Forces and to Canada. For security and operational reasons, recipients' names and citations have not been released.

Canadian Bravery Decorations

Star of Courage

 Tianah Auger
 Asaf Shargall
 Nicole Louise Foran
 Stéphanie Labbé (posthumous)
 Constable Jeff Smiley
 Master Seaman Cecil Jason Sparkes

Medal of Bravery

 Francis Bédard
 Jean-François Bernier
 Andrew Lawrence Bertrend
 Dale Burton Bollivar
 Robert Borduas
 Sergeant Michael Brown
 Constable Brian Murray Carmichael
 Constable Solange Aurelle Phyllis Cormier
 Matthew Crombeen
 Sergeant Brian Robert Eadie
 Constable Jeremy James Falle
 Constable Neal Fowler
 Harry Malcolm Fraser
 Constable Charles Gagné
 Matthew Patrick Gallant
 Simon Glen Gallant
 Constable Charlie Gunner
 Constable Keith Carson Head
 Michael Henry
 Annie Mairin Caitlin Hutchison
 Sarah Beth Hutchison
 Sarah Ann John
 Susan John (posthumous)
 Sergeant Michael Hamilton Johnston, M.B. (This is a second award to the Medal of Bravery for Sergeant Johnston) 
 Andreas Michael Jorgensen
 Constable Steve Kowan
 Constable Jérôme Labonté
 John Lamkey
 Kirk Laroque
 Danick Lévesque
 Jean-Claude Lindsay
 Daniel Gordon Livingston
 Laura Elizabeth MacDonald
 Craig MacInnes
 Jacques Marcoux
 Ian Frederick McBride
 John Frederick Meredith
 Constable Randal Douglas Metzler
 Michel Michaud
 Sergeant George Winton Matthew Myers
 Alexander L. Myros
 Paris Nicolaides
 Paul Alexander Oliver
 Lee Page
 Constable Roger Lee Paris
 Constable Philippe Pauzé
 Wayne David Pink
 Constable Glenn Joseph Pinto
 Constable Sylvain Proulx
 Constable Ken Ramsay, C.D.
 Nicholas Romain
 Constable Nicholas Joseph Roy, C.D.
 McCartney Sealey
 Damien Simard
 Constable Jason Spooner
 Constable Derek St-Cyr
 Patricia St. Denis
 Lenoard C. Taft
 Timothy Jordy Tait
 André Tremblay
 Constable Kathleen Tremblay
 Constable Stéphane Tremblay
 Constable Régis Voyer
 Kyle Walker
 Amanda Walkowiak
 Constable Toby Whinney
 Troy Alan Wilcox
 Sergeant Jeffery Paul Alderdice
 Benoit Bourbonnais
 Christopher Bugelli
 Bertrand Carle
 Sergeant Stéphane Lionel Clavette, C.D.
 Denise Marie Collins
 Sergeant Michael Edgar Cox, C.D.
 Bobbi-Jo Dalziel
 Kevin M. Daniels
 Constable Lane Ashley Douglas-Hunt
 Constable Dwight Doyle
 Shawn Alexander Doyle
 Melville E. Farnell
 André Fauchon
 Warnakulasuriya Raja Fernando
 Constable Warren Neil Fo Sing
 Marc-André Forgues
 Constable Joel Edward Fraser
 Constable Shawn Fraser
 Keith Glibbery
 Taylor John Gostick
 James Randall Haden
 RCMP Constable Deanna Theresa Hagen
 Daniel Henri
 Alden Yale Henry
 John Robert Jacques
 Philippe Jacques-Bélair
 Lieutenant-Colonel David D. Johnson
 Randy Johnson
 Sergeant John L. Jorginson
 Connor Frederick Klein
 Gregory John Kutney
 Constable Robert H. Labelle
 Cindy Levasseur
 Guy Liboiron
 Len MacIntyre
 Jean Marquis
 Francis J. Marshall
 Constable Samantha McInnis
 Steven Douglas McLavish
 Master Corporal Caleb W. McPhail, C.D.
 Brian Darrell McRae
 Jakob Merkel (posthumous)
 David Garnet Mills
 Marilyn Marion Mills
 Constable Michael Alexander Mulville
 Richard S. Munro
 Brock Elliott Nelson
 James Parker
 Samuel Rainville
 Leslie Dawn Rakow
 Alexander C. Robertson
 Gerard Denis Robineau
 Elijah Ashton Rumleski-Boisvert
 Carolina Aida Santizo Arriola
 Eunice Marie Selagi
 Constable John Shean
 Craig Alexander Sibley
 David W. Simpson
 Robert Spencer
 Joseph Sylvester
 Constable Jacques W. Thibeault
 Claude Veilleux
 Chief Warrant Officer William Thomas Walker, C.D.
 Brandon Wheeler
 Mayer Yacowar

Meritorious Service Decorations

Meritorious Service Cross (Military Division)

 GENERAL JAMES MATTIS, M.S.C. (United States Marine Corps)
 LIEUTENANT-COLONEL BARRY MARSHALL SOUTHERN, M.S.C., M.S.M., C.D.
 MAJOR-GENERAL STUART BEARE, C.M.M., M.S.C., M.S.M., C.D.
 BRIGADIER-GENERAL MICHAEL DAY, O.M.M., M.S.C., C.D.
 MAJOR-GENERAL JAMES ROBERT FERRON, O.M.M., M.S.C., C.D.
 LIEUTENANT GENERAL JAMES TERRY, M.S.C. (United States Army)
 LIEUTENANT-GENERAL GUY ROBERT THIBAULT, C.M.M., M.S.C., C.D.

Meritorious Service Cross (Civil Division)

 COLONEL CHRIS AUSTIN HADFIELD, O.Ont., M.S.C., C.D. (Retired)

Meritorious Service Medal (Military Division)

 PETTY OFFICER 1ST CLASS DANIEL JAMES MAURICE ASH, M.S.M., C.D.
 MAJOR DANIEL AUGER, M.S.M., C.D.
 SERGEANT JOSEPH CLAUDE PATRICK AUGER, M.S.M., C.D.
 CHIEF WARRANT OFFICER GÉRALD BLAIS, M.S.M., C.D.
 MAJOR PASCAL BLANCHETTE, M.S.M., C.D.
 LIEUTENANT-COLONEL KIRK DOUGLAS BLAND, M.S.M., C.D.
 LIEUTENANT-COLONEL SÉBASTIEN BOUCHARD, M.S.M., C.D.
 LIEUTENANT-COLONEL CHARLES DOUGLAS CLAGGETT, M.S.M., C.D.
 LIEUTENANT-COMMANDER MATTHEW DAVID COATES, M.S.M., C.D.
 LIEUTENANT-COLONEL DAVID BRUCE COCHRANE, M.S.M., C.D.
 COLONEL DAVID BRUCE COCHRANE, M.S.M., C.D.
 CHIEF WARRANT OFFICER DANIEL ALEXANDER DEBRIE, M.S.M., C.D.
 LIEUTENANT-COLONEL BRIAN CHARLES DERRY, M.S.M., C.D.
 LIEUTENANT-COLONEL MARTIN ANDREAS FRANK, M.S.M., C.D.
 LIEUTENANT(N) MELISSA HELEN FUDGE, M.S.M.
 MAJOR JOSEPH JEAN-LOUIS DENIS GENDRON, M.S.M., C.D.
 LIEUTENANT(N) JEAN-EUDES GENDRON, M.S.M., C.D.
 PETTY OFFICER 2ND CLASS PHILIP MURRAY GORMLEY, M.S.M., C.D.
 WARRANT OFFICER PAUL DERRICK GOULDING, M.S.M., C.D.
 LIEUTENANT-COLONEL ROBERT HARRISON, M.S.M., C.D.
 MAJOR GUY CHARLES INGRAM, M.S.M., C.D.
 COLONEL ERIC JEAN KENNY, M.S.M., C.D.
 CORPORAL ASHRAF KHALIL, M.S.M.
 COMMANDER STÉPHANE JOSEPH DOMINIQUE LAFOND, M.S.M., C.D.
 COLONEL ALEXANDER DONALD MEINZINGER, O.M.M., M.S.M., C.D.
 LIEUTENANT-COLONEL MARK MISENER, M.S.M., C.D.
 COMMANDER DEREK MOSS, M.S.M., C.D.
 LIEUTENANT-COLONEL JOHN PAGANINI, M.S.M. (United States Army)
 COLONEL MICHAEL MATTHEW LAWRENCE RAFTER, M.S.M., C.D.
 MAJOR JEFFREY ALAN RODGER, M.S.M., C.D.
 MAJOR HARJIT SAJJAN, M.S.M., C.D.
 COLONEL JAMES BAXTER SIMMS, O.M.M., M.S.M., C.D.
 COLONEL STEVEN JOSEPH RUSSELL WHELAN, M.S.M., C.D.
 MAJOR PIERRE FRANÇOIS NICOLAS BERTRAND, M.S.M., C.D. 
 LIEUTENANT-COLONEL MAXIME TALBOT, M.S.M.
 LIEUTENANT-COLONEL SUZANNE MARIE BAILEY, M.S.M., C.D.
 CHIEF PETTY OFFICER 2ND CLASS CHRISTOPHER JAMES BLONDE, M.S.M., C.D.
 MAJOR JOSEPH ÉRIC STÉPHANE BRIAND, M.S.M., C.D
 CHIEF WARRANT OFFICER GORDEN ROY CAVANAGH, M.S.M., C.D.
 MAJOR DEREK JOHN CHENETTE, M.S.M., C.D.
 MAJOR ADAM RICHARD CYBANSKI, M.S.M., C.D.
 LIEUTENANT-COLONEL GUY DOIRON, M.S.M., C.D.
 PETTY OFFICER 2ND CLASS MICHÈLE DUMARESQ-OUELLET, M.S.M.
 HONORARY COLONEL DENNIS MICHAEL ERKER, M.S.M.
 HONORARY CAPTAIN(N) THE HONOURABLE MYRA AVA FREEMAN, C.M., O.N.S., M.S.M.
 CHIEF WARRANT OFFICER DAPHNE VIOLA GERMAIN, M.M.M., M.S.M., C.D.
 MAJOR JAY LYMAN INDEWEY, M.S.M., C.D.
 COLONEL DEREK WILLIAM JOYCE, O.M.M., M.S.M., C.D.
 WARRANT OFFICER ALLAN MARK KENDALL, M.S.M., C.D.
 MAJOR DENE LEONARD, M.S.M. (United States Army)
 LIEUTENANT-COLONEL YANNICK LEMIEUX, M.S.M., C.D.
 MAJOR JAY ADAM MACKEEN, M.S.M., C.D.
 MAJOR STEPHEN NOEL, M.S.M., C.D.
 COLONEL PAUL ORMSBY, O.M.M., M.S.M., C.D.
 COMMANDER BRADLEY ALAN PEATS, M.S.M., C.D.
 COLONEL JOSEPH PAUL ALAIN PELLETIER, M.S.M., C.D.
 MASTER WARRANT OFFICER ANTHONY CARL PETTIPAS, M.S.M., C.D.
 MASTER CORPORAL MONTGOMERY PATRICK ROBSON, M.S.M., C.D.
 LIEUTENANT-COLONEL DAVID DONALD ROSS, M.M.M., M.S.M., C.D.
 CHIEF WARRANT OFFICER CHRISTOPHER PAUL RUSK, M.M.M., M.S.M., C.D.
 MAJOR CAROL DIANE SAWATZKY, M.S.M., C.D.
 CHIEF PETTY OFFICER 1ST CLASS ALISTAIR SKINNER, M.S.M., C.D.
 COMMANDER CRAIG TROY SKJERPEN, M.S.M., C.D.
 CHIEF WARRANT OFFICER ANTHONY JAMES SLACK, M.M.M., M.S.M., C.D.
 WARRANT OFFICER GREGORY ALLAN SMIT, S.C., M.S.M., C.D.
 CHIEF PETTY OFFICER 1ST CLASS ROBERT STEPHEN SPINELLI, M.M.M., M.S.M., C.D.
 CAPTAIN(N) KENNETH ROBERT STEWART, M.S.M., C.D.

Erratum
 Correction from 8 December 2012: Meritorious Service Medal (Military Division) to COLONEL JOSEPH PIERRE HERVÉ HERCULE GOSSELIN, O.M.M., M.S.M., C.D.

Commonwealth and Foreign Orders, Decorations and Medal awarded to Canadians

From Her Majesty The Queen in Right of Australia

National Emergency Medal
 Mr. Kelly Bedford

From Her Majesty The Queen in Right of Jamaica

Badge of Honour for Long and Faithful Service (Honorary Member)
 Mr. Hector Delanghe
 Mr. Ken Elgin Forth

From Her Majesty The Queen in Right of the United Kingdom

Commander of the Most Excellent Order of the British Empire
 Ms. Sherry Coutu
 Ms. Johanna Waterous

Member of the Most Excellent Order of the British Empire
 Ms. Kresse Wesling
 Ms. Frances Noronha

British Empire Medal
 Ms. Gloria Olga Crossley

Operational Service Medal with Afghanistan Clasp
 Major Joseph Ianic Nicolas Duval
 Captain Christopher Hogan
 Captain D. Jimmy Leclerc

From the President of the Islamic Republic of Afghanistan

Baryaal Darajaah Yak (Successfulness 1st Grade) Medal
 Major-General Donald M. Day

From Her Majesty The Queen of Denmark

Knight 1st Degree of the Dannebrog
 Mr. Peter Erik Lawrence Teed

From the President of Estonia

Order of Terra Mariana (3rd Class)
 The Honourable Robert Keith Rae

From the President of the Republic of Finland

Knight 1st Class of the Order of the White Rose of Finland
 Mr. Gerald Malcolm Lougheed Jr.

From the President of the French Republic

Officer of the National Order of the Legion of Honour
 Lieutenant-General Yvan Blondin
 Vice-Admiral Paul Andrew Maddison

Knight of the National Order of the Legion of Honour
 Mr. Jean-François Béland
 Mr. Bernard Bélanger
 Mr. Pierre L. Gauthier
 Ms. Linda Hasenfratz

Knight of the National Order of Merit of the Republic of France
 Mrs. Julie Snyder
 Colonel (Retired) Christian Rousseau
 Sister François Solano

Officer of the National Order of Merit of the Republic of France
 Ms. Suzanne Fortier

Knight of the National Order of Merit of the Republic of France
 The Honourable Jocelyne Bourgon

Officer of the Order of the Academic Palms
 Mr. Martin Bielz

Knight of the Order of the Academic Palms
 Mr. André Delisle
 Mrs. Lise Gaboury-Diallo
 Mr. Alain Goldschläger
 Mr. Denis Monière
 Mr. Kenneth Meadwell
 Mr. Maurice Periard
 Mr. François Roberge

Commander of the Order of Arts and Letters
 Mr. Jean-Louis Roy

Officer of the Order of Arts and Letters
 Mr. Michel Côté
 Mr. Edmond Elbaz
 Mr. Wadji Mouawad

Knight of the Order of Arts and Letters
 Ms. Tina Celestin
 Mr. Normand Charbonneau
 Mr. Francis Corpataux
 Mr. Daniel Gelinas
 Mr. Julien MacKay
 Ms. Janine Sutto
 Mr. Guy Delisle
 Ms. Loreena McKennitt

National Defence Medal, Gold Echelon with Gendarmerie Nationale Clasp
 Inspector Nadine Carmel-Tremblay
 Constable Michel Martel

National Defence Medal, Silver Echelon with Armée de Terre Clasp
 Captain Tom Foulds

National Defence Medal with Silver Echelon
 Lieutenant-Colonel Jean-François Bédard
 Major Michaël R. G. Godard
 Captain Marc-André La Haye

National Defence Medal, Bronze Echelon with "État-Major" Clasp
 Mr. Nicolas Morin Valcour

National Defence Medal, Bronze Echelon
 Major William Church

Knight of the Order of Agricultural Merit
 Professor Paul Paquin
 Me Ghislain K.-Laflamme

French Commemorative Medal with Afghanistan Clasp
 Mr. Zobair David Deen

From the President of the Federal Republic of Germany

Knight's Cross of the Order of Merit of the Federal Republic of Germany
 Mr. George Jiři Brady

From the President of Hungary

Commander's Cross of the Order of Merit of Hungary
 Mr. Szabolcs Magyarodi

Officer's Cross of the Order of Merit of Hungary
 Mr. Miklos Mezes
 Mr. Janos Miska

Gold Cross of Merit of Hungary
 Mr. Zoltan Veres
 Mr. Tibor Abraham
 Ms. Susan Margaret Papp-Aykler

From the President of the Republic of Italy

Knight of the National Order of Merit of the Republic of Italy
 Mr. Carman Anthony Giacomantonio
 Mr. John Osborne
 Ms. Josephine Palumbo
 Mr. Italo Spagnuolo
 Ms. Alda Venditti Viero

Knight of the Order of the Star of the Republic of Italy
 Mr. Antonio Caruso
 Mr. Michel Gagnon
 Ms. Maria Giardini

From His Majesty The Emperor of Japan

Order of the Rising Sun, Silver Rays
 Mr. Shinichiro (James) Matsumoto

From the President of the Republic of Korea

Order of Merit for Diplomatic Service
 Mr. Barry Devolin

Order of Civil Merit, Moran Medal (2nd Class)
 Mr. Dominic Barton

Civil Merit Medal
 Mr. James McCormack

From the President of the Republic of Moldova

Civil Merit Medal
 The Honourable Corneliu Chisu

From His Majesty The King of the Netherlands

Commemorative Medal for Peacekeeping Operations with ISAF Clasp
 Captain Adam K. Guibat

From the Secretary of the North Atlantic Treaty Organization

NATO Meritorious Service Medal
 Lieutenant-General Charles Bouchard
 Major Brian Erickson
 Major Michael Van Marum
 Lieutenant-Colonel Larry Weir

From the President of the Republic of Poland

Commander's Cross of the Order of Merit of the Republic of Poland
 General (Retired) Walter J. Natynczyk

Officer's Cross of the Order of Merit of the Republic of Poland
 Mrs. Longina Dimant
 Ms. Janina Muszyńska

Knight's Cross of the Order of Merit of the Republic of Poland
 Mrs. Urszula Sulinska
 Mr. Krzysztof Kasprzyk
 Mrs. Maria Karulis

Officer's Cross of the Order of Polonia Restituta
 Mrs. Zofia Lewicka-Pezowicz

Cross of Freedom and Solidarity of the Republic of Poland
 Mr. Piotr Jakubiak
 Mr. Mariusz Labentowicz
 Mr. Ladyslaw Piotrowski
 to Mr. Kazimierz Pater
 Mr. Grzegorz Staszewski

Gold Cross of Merit of the Republic of Poland
 Mr. Shimon Fogel
 Mr. Michal Kuleczka
 Mr. Bogdan Labecki
 Mrs. Kinga Mitrowska-Kowalska
 Mrs. Agata Pilitowska
 Ms. Maria Dukowski
 Ms. Róża Granek
 Ms. Maria Michalik
 Mr. Stanislaw Jaworski

Silver Cross of Merit of the Republic of Poland
 Ms. Ewa Anna Karpinska
 Mr. Richard Marceau 
 Ms. Marie-Christine Palczak
 Ms. Ewa Wiklik

Bronze Cross of Merit of the Republic of Poland
 Mr. Tomasz Trembowski

Long Term Marriage Relationship Medal
 Mrs. Iwona Brzeska
 Mr. Stanislaw Brzeski

From the President of the United States of America

Commander of the Legion of Merit
 Vice-Admiral Paul Andrew Maddison,

Officer of the Legion of Merit
 Brigadier-General Robert J. Chekan
 Major-General Donald M. Day
 Lieutenant-General Thomas James Lawson
 Colonel Michel Duhamel
 Colonel Christian G. Juneau
 Captain(N) Richard Bergeron
 Brigadier-General J. Y. R. André Viens

Legion of Merit (Degree of Legionnaire)
 Chief Warrant Officer Mark L. Baisley

Bronze Star Medal
 Major Eghtedar Manouchehri
 Brigadier-General Karl D. McQuillan
 Lieutenant-Colonel Douglas Clark
 Major William Church

Meritorious Service Medal with First Oak Leaf Cluster
 Colonel Sylvain Bédard
 Major Michael L. Evans

Meritorious Service Medal
 Captain Jean-François Latreille
 Major Leonard M. Wappler
 Major James Armstrong
 Major Jean P. Dorris
 Lieutenant-Colonel Donald B. McKinnon
 Major Marco E. Vunak
 Major Luc Hamel
 Major Adam M. McCabe
 Lieutenant-Colonel Michael G. Hogan
 Lieutenant-Colonel Arnold Herbert Kettenacker
 Chief Warrant Officer Christopher Paul Rusk
 Major Patrick Granholm
 Major Michael L. Evans
 Lieutenant-Colonel Casey W. McLean
 Major John T. Williams
 Lieutenant-Commander Brenton H. Baxter
 Major Stephen F. Gallagher
 Major John Harris
 Major Earl J. Maher
 Major Conrad E. Bourgeois
 Captain Nasser El-Beltagy
 Lieutenant-Colonel Kevin B. Ferdinand
 Major John K. Vintar
 Major Stephen Harvie
 Major Daniel R. Hilliker
 Lieutenant-Colonel Christopher Lawrence Swallow

Air Medal, First Oak Leaf Cluster
 Captain Shawn Guilbault
 Major Richard A. Jolette

Air Medal, Second Strike/Flight Award
 Captain Jared O. Penney

Air Medal
 Captain Shawn A. Guilbault
 Master Corporal Carrie A. Clifford
 Captain Erik N. Rozema-Seaton
 Master Corporal Jonathan P. Peters
 Captain Karen Baker
 Sergeant Grant T. Krygsveld

Erratums of Commonwealth and Foreign Orders, Decorations and Medal awarded to Canadians

Corrections of 23 February 2013
 The notice published on page 96 of the January 26, 2013, issue of the Canada Gazette, Part I, is hereby amended as follows: From the President of the Republic of Poland, the Silver Cross of Merit of the Republic of Poland to Mr. Richard Marceau.

References 

Monarchy in Canada